The Russian Navy is the naval arm of the Russian Armed Forces. It has existed in various forms since 1696; its present iteration was formed in January 1992 when it succeeded the Navy of the Commonwealth of Independent States (which had itself succeeded the Soviet Navy following the dissolution of the Soviet Union in late December 1991).

The Imperial Russian Navy was established by Peter the Great (Peter I) in October 1696. The symbols of the Russian Navy, the St. Andrew's ensign (seen to the right), and most of its traditions were established personally by Peter I.

The Russian Navy possesses the vast majority of the former Soviet naval forces, and currently comprises the Northern Fleet, the Pacific Fleet, the Black Sea Fleet, the Baltic Fleet, the Caspian Flotilla, the Permanent task force in the Mediterranean, Naval Aviation, and the Coastal Troops (consisting of the Naval Infantry and the Coastal Missile and Artillery Troops).

The Russian Navy suffered severely with the collapse of the Soviet Union due to insufficient maintenance, lack of funding, and subsequent effects on the training of personnel and timely replacement of equipment. Another setback was attributed to Russia's domestic shipbuilding industry, which was in decline due to the absence of modern hardware and technology.

In 2013, a rise in gas and oil prices enabled a sort of renaissance of the Russian Navy due to increased available funds, which may have allowed Russia to begin "developing the capacity to modernize". In August 2014, Defence Minister Sergei Shoigu said that Russian naval capabilities would be bolstered with new weapons and equipment within the next six years in response to the enlargement of NATO and the beginning of the Russo-Ukrainian War.

History

 The 1991 dissolution of the Soviet Union led to a severe decline in the Russian Navy. Defence expenditures were severely reduced. Many ships were scrapped or laid up as accommodation ships at naval bases, and the building program was essentially stopped. Sergey Gorshkov's buildup during the Soviet period had emphasised ships over support facilities, but Gorshkov had also retained ships in service beyond their effective lifetimes, so a reduction had been inevitable in any event. The situation was exacerbated by the impractical range of vessel types which the Soviet military-industrial complex, with the support of the leadership, had forced on the navy—taking modifications into account, the Soviet Navy in the mid-1980s had nearly 250 different classes of ship.

The Kiev-class aircraft carrying cruisers and many other ships were prematurely retired, and the incomplete second Admiral Kuznetsov-class aircraft carrier Varyag was eventually sold to the People's Republic of China by Ukraine. Funds were only allocated for the completion of ships ordered prior to the collapse of the USSR, as well as for refits and repairs on fleet ships taken out of service since. However, the construction times for these ships tended to stretch out extensively: in 2003 it was reported that the Akula-class submarine Nerpa had been under construction for fifteen years.

Storage of decommissioned nuclear submarines in ports near Murmansk became a significant issue, with the Bellona Foundation reporting details of lowered readiness. Naval support bases outside Russia, such as Cam Ranh Bay in Vietnam, were gradually closed, with the exception of the modest technical support base in Tartus, Syria to support ships deployed to the Mediterranean. Naval Aviation declined as well from its height as Soviet Naval Aviation, dropping from an estimated 60,000 personnel with some 1,100 combat aircraft in 1992 to 35,000 personnel with around 270 combat aircraft in 2006. In 2002, out of 584 naval aviation crews only 156 were combat ready, and 77 ready for night flying. Average annual flying time was 21.7 hours, compared to 24 hours in 1999.

Training and readiness also suffered severely. In 1995, only two missile submarines at a time were being maintained on station, from the Northern and Pacific Fleets. The decline culminated in the loss of the Oscar II-class submarine Kursk during the Northern Fleet summer exercise that was intended to back up the publication of a new naval doctrine. The exercise was to have culminated with the deployment of the Admiral Kuznetsov task group to the Mediterranean.

As of February 2008, the Russian Navy had 44 nuclear submarines with 24 operational; 19 diesel-electric submarines, 16 operational; and 56 first and second rank surface combatants, 37 operational. Despite this improvement, the November 2008 accident on board the  attack boat Nerpa during sea trials before lease to India represented a concern for the future.

The strength and quality of the Russian Navy started to improve during the 2010s. In 2012, as part of an ambitious rebuilding effort, President Vladimir Putin announced a plan to build 51 modern ships and 24 submarines by 2020. Of the 24 submarines, 16 were to be nuclear-powered. On 10 January 2013, the Russian Navy finally accepted its first new Borei-class SSBN for service. A second Borei (Aleksandr Nevskiy) was undergoing sea trials and entered service on 21 December 2013.

A third Borei-class boat was launched and began trials in early 2013, and was commissioned in late 2014. As of early 2022, five Borei-class boats are in service, along with three  nuclear attack submarines. More vessels of these classes are building along with additional  and Improved-Kilo-class conventional attack submarines. The surface fleet is also being modernized, principally by introducing at least six new classes of corvette/offshore patrol vessels, a new class of frigate (the Admiral Gorshkov class), as well as new classes of amphibious ships and support vessels. As of 2019, total tonnage of Russian Navy stand at 1,216,547 tonnes.

On 23 June 2021, Russian forces were involved in an incident with a British Royal Navy ship in the waters of Crimea.

In 2022 the Russian Navy took part in the invasion of Ukraine, starting with the attack on Snake Island at the beginning of the war. Moskva sunk on 14 April 2022 after a fire broke out and forced the crew to evacuate. The Ukrainian military reported that they hit the ship with Neptune anti-ship missiles, however the Russian military did not confirm this. The ship subsequently capsized and sank while the Russian Navy was attempting to tow her into port. The sinking of Moskva is the most significant Russian naval loss in action since World War II.

Leadership

 August 1992 – November 1997, FADM Feliks Gromov
 November 1997 – September 2005, FADM Vladimir Kuroyedov
 September 2005 – September 2007, FADM Vladimir Masorin
 September 2007 – May 2012, ADM Vladimir Vysotsky
 May 2012 – February 2016, ADM Viktor Chirkov
 February 2016 – May 2019, ADM Vladimir Korolyov
 May 2019 – present, ADM Nikolai Yevmenov

Structure

Since 2012 the headquarters of the Russian Navy (Russian Navy Main Staff) is once again located in The Admiralty in Saint Petersburg. Russian naval manpower is a mixture of conscripts serving one-year terms and volunteers (Officers and Ratings).  In 2006 the IISS assessed there were 142,000 personnel in the Russian Navy. This personnel number includes the Naval Infantry (Marines) and the Coastal Missile and Artillery Troops. As of 2008 the conscription term was reduced to one year and a major downsizing and reorganization were underway. In 2008, plans were announced to move the headquarters to the Admiralty building in St. Petersburg, the historic location of the headquarters of the Imperial Russian Navy. The Navy Staff finally relocated there in November 2012.

The Russian Navy is organised into four combat services - the Surface Forces, the Submarine Forces, the Naval Aviation and the Coastal Troops. Additionally the navy also includes support units afloat and ashore. It does not include special forces. The Naval Spetsnaz brigades are part of the Main Intelligence Directorate attached to the respective fleets and the Counter-Diversionary Forces and Assets (ПДСС) (which are units, protecting the Navy from incursions of enemy special forces) fall within the Coastal Forces.

During the Cold War the Soviet Armed Forces made the distinction between the various naval commands. The main fleets were the Northern and the Pacific Fleet. They were tasked with independent operations on the high seas and for that reason included strategic surface, submarine and air forces, including the country's naval nuclear deterrent. Due to the limited geography of the Baltic and the Black Seas the respective Baltic and Black Sea Fleets were given a more circumscribed role in support of adjacent ground formation (the Main Command of the Troops of the Western Direction in Legnica (Poland) and the Main Command of the Troops of the South-Western Direction in Chișinău).

These two fleets were armed with shorter-range weapon systems than the main fleets (diesel-electric submarines, Sukhoi Su-24 fighter-bombers and a larger quantity of frigates and corvettes). Due to the closed nature of the Caspian Sea (still connected to the Baltic and Black Seas through the Volga River and the system of rivers and canals and navigable for ships of corvette size) its Caspian Flotilla had an even more limited role than the Fleets and played a defensive role supporting the Main Command of the Troops of the Southern Direction in Baku.

With the end of the Cold War a significant reduction in forces followed. Before the 2008 Russian military reform, the four fleets were ranked as equal in status to the six Military Districts. With the reform measures going into force the number of Military Districts was reduced and became new Joint Strategic Commands and the four fleets and one flotilla were subordinated to them with status equal to the Ground Forces and the Air Forces armies. Due to Russia's increased interests in the Arctic region and the importance of Russia's western/northwestern maritime defence the Northern Fleet, originally part of the Joint Strategic Command West (Western Military District), on 12 December 2014 became the basis for the newly formed fifth Northern Fleet Joint Strategic Command.

Submarine and surface forces 
The submarine and surface forces form the backbone of the Navy. The submarines form part of dedicated submarine squadrons and flotillas or part of squadrons and flotillas of mixed composition together with major surface combatants. The Russian Navy retains a rigid structure, whose levels of command could, according to military regulations, be directly equalled to the corresponding ground and air forces counterparts:

Coastal troops

Coastal Troops include the Naval Infantry and the Coastal Missile and Artillery Troops.

The Russian Naval Infantry are the amphibious force of the Russian Navy and can trace their origins back to 1705, when Peter the Great issued a decree for an infantry regiment "of naval equipage". Since its formation it has seen action in the Napoleonic Wars, the Crimean War, the Russo-Japanese War, the First and Second World Wars, and the Chechen and Georgian conflicts. Under the leadership of Admiral Gorshkov during the Cold War, the Soviet Navy expanded the reach of the Naval Infantry and deployed it worldwide on numerous occasions, but since the dissolution of the Soviet Union its role has been greatly reduced.

The Soviet Naval Infantry and their Russian successors have a reputation as elite shock troops. For their black uniforms and ferocious performance in combat in the Black Sea and Baltic Sea regions during World War II they received the nickname "The Black Death" (German: der schwarze Tod). The Russian Naval Infantry is a mechanised force, organised in brigades, independent regiments and independent battalions. The 55th Naval Infantry Division of the Pacific Fleet has been disbanded in 2009 and replaced by two separate brigades. Each brigade has a tank battalion, a self-propelled artillery battalion, a self-propelled air defence battalion, mechanised marine infantry battalions, other support units and one Airborne Assault Naval Infantry Battalion (десантно-штурмовой батальон морской пехоты), parachute and air assault qualified, with the mission to spearhead amphibious landings.

The coastal defence troops of the Russian Navy are conventional mechanised brigades with the main task to prevent enemy amphibious landings. An example of coastal defence troops are those of the Baltic Fleet. With Estonia, Latvia and Lithuania declaring independence at the end of the Soviet Union the Baltic Military District practically disintegrated. The massive ground forces formations left landlocked in the Kaliningrad Oblast were transferred from the ground forces to naval command and control. The integration of naval infantry and coastal defence troops is a relatively new tendency from the 2010s in order to simplify the naval command structure and the new Arctic infantry brigades in formation under the Northern Fleet Joint Strategic Command fall within that process.

The coastal artillery troops also play a very important role for the Navy. The geography of the Barents Sea, the Baltic Sea, the Black Sea and the Sea of Okhotsk as well as the Caspian Sea makes the deployment of shore-based, anti-ship systems in an area-denying role very effective. They deploy K-300P Bastion-P supersonic ASCM, 3M-54 Kalibr cruise subsonic ASCM and A-222E Bereg-E 130mm coastal mobile artillery system as well as self-propelled surface-to-air missile systems.

The Naval Infantry and Coastal Troops are led by the Deputy Commander for Naval Infantry/Commandant of the Naval Infantry of the Russian Navy, Lieutenant General (NI) Aleksandr Kolpatsenko. Their motto is: "Where We Are, There is Victory!"

Naval aviation

[[File:Su27K (Su33) DD-SD-99-06153.jpg|thumb|A Sukhoi Su-33 from the 279th Shipborne Fighter Aviation Regiment on Admiral Kuznetsovs flight deck]]
The first naval aviation units in Russia were formed from 1912 through 1914 as a part of the Baltic Fleet and the Black Sea Fleet. Since its formation, it has participated in the Russian Civil War, World War II and in many other conflicts throughout Europe, the Middle East and Asia (statement requires source citation). During the Cold War the naval aviation pursued a policy of deploying large numbers of bombers in maritime strike roles to counter the U.S. Navy's extensive fleet of aircraft carriers, by 1989 it operated over 1,000 fixed-wing aircraft with the majority being bombers such as the Tu-22M "Backfire" and the Tu-16 "Badger".

Since the fall of the Soviet Union however, it has been significantly reduced in size. The Tu-22Ms have been transferred to the Aerospace Forces and since then the combat arm of the Naval Aviation is built around Sukhoi Su-33s, Mikoyan MiG-29Ks, with Sukhoi Su-30s and Sukhoi Su-34s replacing the obsolete Sukhoi Su-24s.

As of 2007, the Russian Naval Aviation consists of the following components:
 Naval missile-carrying aviation
 Shore-based ASW aviation
 Attack (Shturmovik) aviation
 Shore-based fighter aviation
 Reconnaissance aviation
 Shipborne aviation (fighters and ASW aircraft)
 Auxiliary air units

 Ranks, rates and insignia 

 Officers 
The following table of navy ranks illustrates those of the Russian Federation. The rank in Russian is given first, followed by the English transliteration.

 Warrant officers and ratings 
Warrant officers and rates of the Russian Navy'''

Equipment
 Ships and submarines See List of active Russian Navy shipsAircraft

Radars

The Russian Navy uses Podsolnukh over-the-horizon surface wave radar for detection of ships. As of 2019, four radars have been delivered to the coasts of Caspian Sea, Okhotsk Sea, Sea of Japan and Baltic Sea.

 Military districts and fleets 
The Russian Navy consists of four fleets and one flotilla with all of them subordinated to the newly formed Military Districts-Joint Operational Strategic Commands.

Northern Military District – Northern Joint Strategic Command
Northern Fleet

The Russian Northern Fleet, dating to 1733 but established as a modern formation in 1933, is headquartered at Severomorsk and spread around various bases in the greater Murmansk area. It is the main fleet of the Russian Navy and currently comprises
Admiral Flota Sovetskogo Soyuza Kuznetsov aircraft carrier (1 in refit)
Kirov-class battlecruiser (2, including one in long-term refit/upgrade)
Slava-class cruiser  (1)
Udaloy II-class destroyer (1)
Udaloy-class destroyer (3)
Sovremennyy-class destroyer (1)
 Admiral Gorshkov-class frigate (2, plus one on sea trials in the Baltic)
 Grisha-class corvette (6)
 Nanuchka-class corvette (1)
Dolgorukiy-class submarine (2)
Delta IV-class submarine (5)
Oscar-class submarine (2)
Yasen-class submarine (2)
Akula-class submarine (6)
Sierra-class submarine (2, plus 2 inactive/reserve)
Victor III-class submarine (2)
Lada-class submarine (1, plus 1 on sea trials in the Baltic as of December 2021)
Kilo-class submarine (4)
Delta IV-class special operations submarine BS-64 Podmoskovye (1)
K-239 Belgorod special operations submarine (1, in an "experimental role" with the Northern Fleet as of July 2022; projected to transfer to the Pacific Fleet in due course)
 B-90 Sarov special operations submarine (1)
Losharik (AS-12/or 28/or 31) special operations submarine (1 in refit/repair)
Delta III-class special operations submarine Orenburg (BS-136) (1)
Paltus-class special operations mini-submarine (2)
Kashalot-class special operations submarine (2)

The Northern Fleet also includes patrol ships, mine countermeasures vessels, light amphibious ships and support and logistic ships.

Western Military District – Western Joint Strategic Command

Baltic Fleet

The Baltic Fleet, established on 18 May 1703, is based in Baltiysk and Kronshtadt, with its headquarters in the city of Kaliningrad, Kaliningrad Oblast. The Fleet consists of the following units:
Sovremenny-class destroyer (1 in prolonged refit)
Neustrashimy-class frigate (2)
Steregushchiy-class multi-role corvette (4)
Buyan-M-class corvette (3)
Karakurt-class corvette (3)
Tarantul-class corvette (6)
Nanuchka-class corvette (4)
Parchim-class corvette (6)
Kilo-class submarine (1 assigned unit as of 2020)

The Baltic Fleet also includes patrol vessels, minehunters, amphibious ships and support vessels.

Southern Military District – Southern Joint Strategic Command
Black Sea Fleet

The Black Sea Fleet, established on 2 May 1783, is based at the Sevastopol, Karantinnaya, and Streletskaya Bays in Sevastopol which is also the location of its headquarters, and at Novorossiysk in Krasnodar Kray. The fleet also has various other facilities on the Crimean Peninsula and facilities in Krasnodar Kray. The Black Sea Fleet's flagship, the cruiser Moskva, was sunk on 14 April 2022 during the 2022 Russian invasion of Ukraine. The Tapir-class landing ship Saratov was also scuttled on 24 March 2022 after it was damaged in an attack. The Fleet consists of the following units:

Admiral Grigorovich-class frigate (3)
Burevestnik (Krivak)-class frigate (2)
Steregushchiy-class multi-role corvette (1 on sea trials in the Baltic)
Buyan-M-class corvette (4)
Karakurt-class corvette (1 on sea trials)
Bykov-class corvette/offshore patrol ship (4)
Tarantul-class corvette (4)
Bora-class corvette (2)
Grisha-class corvette (6)
Kilo-class submarine (1)
Improved Kilo-class submarine (6)

The Black Sea Fleet also includes patrol and coastal protection vessels, amphibious ships, and support vessels.

Operational Command South - Tartus

The Russian Navy maintains a base under the command of the Southern Military District in Syria at Tartus. The Mediterranean squadron was disestablished soon after the collapse of the Soviet Union, but a small naval logistics support facility remained there. In January 2017 Russia and Syria signed an agreement, to be valid for 49 years, to expand the Tartus facility with a view to improving the support at Tartus.

On 4 February 2022, naval detachments from the Northern Fleet and Baltic Fleet arrived at Tartus. Large amphibious assault ships Pyotr Morgunov, Georgy Pobedonosets, Olenegorsky Gornyak, Korolyov, Minsk and Kaliningrad were under the direction of Russian Navy Commander-in-Chief Admiral Nikolay Yevmenov. In April 2022 there were around 20 Russian naval ships in the Mediterranean Sea. On 11 May it was reported that the flotilla had remained without change since early February. There were 13 ships and 5 support vessels of the four Russian fleets, including 9 attack missile ships. The formation of a "Mediterranean Squadron" of the Russian Navy in February 2022, using the Northern, Baltic, and Pacific Fleets' ships allowed the Russian Black Sea Fleet to return a large number of ships to the Black Sea some time prior to Russia’s attack on Ukraine. On 27 February three days after the commencement of the Russian invasion of Ukraine Turkey (who acts as guarantor of the Montreux Convention) decided to ban the passage through the straits of any warships whose homeport is not in the Black Sea.

Caspian Flotilla

The Caspian Flotilla, established on 4 November 1722, is based in Astrakhan and Makhachkala with its headquarters in Astrakhan. The Fleet consists of:
Tatarstan/Gepard-class frigate (2)
Buyan-class corvette (3)
Buyan-M-class corvette (3)
Tarantul-class corvette (1)

The Caspian Flotilla also includes 4 small artillery ships, patrol and mine warfare ships as well as landing craft.

Eastern Military District – Eastern Joint Strategic Command

Pacific Fleet

The Pacific Fleet, established on 10 May 1731, is headquartered in Vladivostok and based around Vladivostok and Petropavlovsk-Kamchatskiy. The Fleet consists of the following units:
Slava-class cruiser (1)
Sovremennyy-class destroyer (1 inactive since 2005; still reported in refit as of 2020)
Udaloy-class destroyer (4)
Steregushchiy-class multi-role corvette (3, plus 1 in sea trials)
Gremyashchiy-class multi-role corvette (1) 
Tarantul-class corvette (10)
Grisha-class corvette (8)
Nanuchka-class corvette (1-3)
Dolgorukiy-class submarine (4)
Delta III-class submarine (1)
Yasen-class submarine (1, plus 1 destined for the Pacific on sea trials in Northern Fleet operational area as of June 2022)
Oscar-class submarine (5)
Akula-class submarine (4)
Kilo-class submarine (6-7)
Improved Kilo-class submarine (4; the fourth boat was deployed in the Baltic as of November 2022)

The Pacific Fleet also includes patrol ships, mine warfare ships, amphibious ships, and support vessels. There are also naval aviation and coastal troops and naval infantry components.

Future and modernization

Russia's military budget expanded from 1998 until 2015, but economic problems including a sharp decline in oil prices led to budget cuts in 2016. Higher expenditure led to an increase in numbers of ships under construction, initially focusing on submarines, such as the conventional Petersburg (Lada)-class and nuclear Severodvinsk (Yasen)-class. Some older vessels have been refitted as well. Jane's Fighting Ships commented in 2004 that the construction programme was too focused on Cold War scenarios, given the submarine emphasis.

According to the Russian Defence Ministry, share of modern armament in the Navy has reached more than 50% in 2014. A report from December 2019 estimated the figure at 68%. However, in September 2020 it was reported that the defence budget was to be cut by 5% as part of a shift to social spending and in response the financial impacts of the COVID-19 pandemic. The resulting impact of such a cut on Russian Navy modernization plans was not immediately apparent. Likely more significant is the impact of sanctions imposed on the Russian Federation after 2022 Russian invasion of Ukraine. In 2021, Russian Security Council Secretary Nikolai Patrushev reportedly acknowledged that the Russian defence industry “is still dependent on foreign technologies.” The impact of western sanctions on naval procurement projects, given both reduced access to foreign technologies and significant pressure on the defence budget, had yet to be determined.

The Steregushchiy-class corvettes, the lead ship of which was laid down on 21 December 2001, is the first new surface construction since the collapse of the Soviet Union, while the new Admiral Sergei Gorshkov class frigates marks the first attempt of the Navy to return to the construction of large blue water capable vessels. The Russian Navy had been planning to procure a new class of destroyer, the general-purpose Project 21956. The Lider-class has been envisaged as a "green water" vessel and was anticipated to be nuclear-powered.

The project was reportedly suspended in 2020, apparently in favour of the less expensive Project 22350 Admiral Gorshkov-class frigates. The Gorshkov-class vessels have themselves experienced technical challenges and in 2020 it was initially suggested that the larger 22350M variant of that class would not be proceeding. However, it was later reported that design work on both the Lider and the 22350M variant of the Gorshkov-class was in fact moving forward.

In keeping with the emphasis on strategic forces, the Navy's submarine fleet is being modernized by the acquisition of several classes of strategic and tactical submarines. Up to 12 Borei/Dolgorukiy-class SSBNs are planned to replace older classes in both the Northern and Pacific fleets. These are being complemented by new Yasen and Khabarovsk-class SSGNs, as well as conventional submarines of the Improved Kilo and Lada classes. However, in terms of the tactical nuclear submarine fleet, it is unclear whether the new Yasen-class, Khabarovsk-class, and potential follow-on models, can be produced in sufficient numbers, and on a timely basis, to replace aging older model nuclear submarines on a one-for-one basis. It has been reported that Russian third-generation nuclear submarines have not been modernized to a level to avoid block obsolescence before 2030.

On 28 April 2010, the Ukrainian parliament ratified an agreement to extend Russia's lease of Crimean base facilities to 2042 with an option for five more years, through 2047.  Subsequent to the annexation of Crimea by Russia in 2014, this agreement has been officially invalidated by the Russian State Duma. The Russian Navy has also revealed that the Russia's Black Sea Fleet will receive 30 new ships by 2020 and will become self-sufficient with its own infrastructure in the Crimean peninsula. The fleet will be updated with new warships, submarines, and auxiliary vessels within the next six years. The new ships built for the Black Sea Fleet include three Admiral Grigorovich-class frigates (originally six, but two of the remaining three were sold to India and in 2021 it was reported that a third ship would also be sold abroad) and six Varshavyanka-class (Improved Kilo-class) diesel-electric submarines.

On 27 December 2015, state-owned United Shipbuilding Corporation declared that by 2019 the company would have the technical ability to build aircraft and helicopter carriers, which came as some surprise to analysts as previously the company had stated carrier-building would not take place until 2025 at the earliest. Russia's only existing carrier, the Soviet era Admiral Kuznetsov will remain in service at least until 2030.

In a May 2017, ten year defence review the development of a new aircraft carrier and nuclear powered destroyers was cancelled in favour of concentrating modernisation efforts on the nuclear triad. Development of a sixth generation SSBN was announced even though the fifth generation Borei class are still under construction as was a fleet of sub-frigate sized surface combatants.

On 14 July 2021, shipyard Sevmash announced that for the first time in decades several nuclear submarines of different projects are undergoing sea trials. In the summer 2021, three nuclear submarines were undergoing sea trials simultaneously: Borei II class Knyaz Oleg, Yasen-M class Novosibirsk and modernized Antey class Belgorod. The last time in Russia or Soviet Union nuclear submarines of three different classes were undergoing sea trials was 1993, when Improved Akula class Tigr, Antey class Omsk and Sierra II class Pskov were undergoing sea trials. The increased intensity of sea trials taking place indicates enhanced shipbuilding in Russian Navy.

Main Naval Parade in St. Petersburg

Since 2017, by the decree of the President of Russia dated 27 July 2017, the tradition of holding the "Main Naval Parade" in St. Petersburg on the Navy Day has been restored. Prior to 2017, in Soviet and Russian Federation times the previously held annual St. Petersburg Navy Day parade was not so specifically named. The parade is composed of ships and sailors representing the several fleets and the Caspian Flotilla with small ships and submarines in the Neva River and the larger ones arrayed off Kronshtadt in the Gulf of St. Petersburg. It is celebrated annually on the last Sunday of July during the Navy Day holiday.

Deployments from 2018

Ocean Shield
In the years 2018–2021, the Russian Navy has been organizing central annual naval exercise called Ocean Shield.

Between 1–8 September 2018, Ocean Shield exercise was held for the first time. Unlike 2019 and 2020 exercises, conducted in the Baltic Sea, the first exercise took place in the Mediterranean Sea. 26 ships, 2 submarines and 34 aircraft were included. Among participants were cruiser Marshal Ustinov, destroyers Smetlivy and Severomorsk, frigates Admiral Grigorovich, Admiral Essen, Admiral Makarov, Pytlivy and Yaroslav Mudry, corvettes Vishny Volochyok, Grad Sviyazhsk and Veliky Ustyug and conventional submarines Kolpino and Velikiy Novgorod.

The aircraft present included Tu-160 bombers, Tu-142 and Il-38 anti-submarine aircraft and Su-33 and MiG-29K maritime fighters. This was the largest Russian naval exercise in the Mediterranean Sea of the post-Cold War era and the largest Russian post-Cold War naval exercise in the far sea zone. In terms of distant location and number of capital ships participating it's comparable only to June 2021 exercises of the Pacific Fleet off the Hawaii islands.

Organized between 1–9 August 2019, the second Ocean Shield exercise was the exercise with the largest number of participating ships (69 ships, including 49 warships and 20 support ships) in the independent Russia and took place in the Baltic Sea. The 22 known ships of the exercise "Ocean Shield 2019" include cruiser Marshal Ustinov, destroyer Severomorsk and frigate Admiral Gorshkov of the Northern Fleet, as well as Baltic Fleet's frigate Yaroslav Mudry, corvettes Steregushchy, Soobrazitelny, Stoykiy, Boikiy, Passat, Geyzer, Serpukhov, Mitishchi, Chuvashiya, Morshansk, Liven, Urengoy, R-257 and LSTs Aleksandr Shabalin, Kaliningrad, Minsk and Korolyov, as well as nuclear submarine Smolensk. Other possible participants include ships, participating in the July Naval Parade in St. Petersburg, i.e. frigate Admiral Kasatonov, corvettes Gremyashchy and Sovetsk, submarine Kronshtadt and minesweepers Ivan Antonov, Aleksandr Obukhov and Pavel Khenov.

On 3 August 2020, third Ocean Shield exercise started in the Baltic Sea and included Northern Fleet's destroyer Vice-Admiral Kulakov and LST Pyotr Morgunov and Baltic Fleet's corvettes Steregushchy, Boikiy and Stoikiy.

Combined-fleet exercises
June 2021
In 2021, no usual Ocean Shield exercise was conducted in August or September in the Baltic Sea. However, in June, the Pacific, Northern and Black Sea fleets conducted large-scale exercises. In mid June, four Russian cruisers and four destroyers were simultaneously at sea, or all operational large surface combatants except destroyer Severomorsk, which was probably the first time in the post-Cold war era. A complex large-scale exercise took place in the central Pacific Ocean, where the Russian Navy conducted possibly the strongest exercise of the post-Soviet era.

It took place prior to the 2021 Putin-Biden summit, similarly to Aport and Atrina exercises that were held in 1985 and 1987 prior to the Geneva and Washington summits of Gorbachev and Reagan to improve Soviet negotiation position. Officially, however, it was stated that the exercise is an answer to the exercise Agile Dagger 2021 of the US Pacific Fleet, employing one third of the operational submarines of the US Pacific Fleet.

In the Barents Sea, cruisers Marshal Ustinov and Pyotr Veliky, destroyer Vice-admiral Kulakov and submarines Kaluga, Gepard and Dmitry Donskoy were active. 

Between 7 and 24 June, a large-scale exercise was conducted by the Pacific Fleet in the central Pacific Ocean, being the first post-Cold war Russian naval exercise in that area (minor exceptions being destroyer Admiral Panteleev taking part in RIMPAC-2012 exercise and frigate Admiral Gorshkov sailing near Hawaii in 2019). It included cruiser Varyag, destroyers Marshal Shaposhnikov and Admiral Panteleyev, corvettes Sovershenny, Gromky and Aldar Tsydenzhapov, (a) nuclear submarine(s) (likely Omsk and Kuzbass) and intelligence ship Kareliya.

The exercise started in the central Pacific Ocean on 10 June, and on 21 June the ships 2500 nautical miles southeast of the Kuril islands simulated an attack on the enemy carrier strike group. Prior to that, the ships operated in two groups, sailing at 300 nautical miles from each other, one of them playing the role of enemy. The largest auxiliary ship of the Russian Navy Marshal Krylov also took part in the exercise and acted as a command ship for the commander of the exercise, rear admiral Konstantin Kabantsev, commander of Primorskaya Flotilla, as well as hospital ship Irtysh and MiG-31 interceptors and Il-38 and Tu-142 anti-submarine aircraft.

On 24 June, the final day of the exercise, three Tu-95 bombers, several Tu-22M bombers, escorted by interceptors MiG-31BM and two Il-78 tankers flied to the central Pacific Ocean as well. The Tu-95s delivered conditional strikes against enemy's critical infrastructure and Tu-22M delivered strikes against enemy's conditional carrier strike group together with Varyag and Marshal Shaposhnikov.

An additional destroyer Admiral Tributs was deployed to the South China Sea, accompanying nuclear submarine Nerpa.

On 18 June 2021, the Black Sea Fleet deployed cruiser Moskva to the Mediterranean Sea, which, amid deployment of Queen Elizabeth to the Eastern Mediterranean, took part in an unprecedented anti-ship exercise with bombers Tu-22M and interceptors MiG-31K both deployed to Syria for the first time in May and June. A MiG-31K reportedly fired a Kinzhal missile against a ground target in Syria, while a newest air defence system S-500 was reportedly tested at Khmeymim airbase and obtained a lock on F-35 fighter from Queen Elizabeth. The exercise included rocket fire 30 km away from Queen Elizabeth.

January–February 2022
In January–February 2022 large-scale exercise of all Russian fleets took place with some 140 warships and support ships.

In the Northern Fleet it included two task groups. First, cruiser Marshal Ustinov, destroyer Vice-Admiral Kulakov and frigate Admiral Kasatonov, as well as tanker Vyazma and tug SB-406 were deployed to the southwest of Ireland, conducting first Russian post-Cold war naval exercise west of British isles. Second, destroyer Severomorsk, frigate Admiral Gorshkov, LST Ivan Gren, nuclear submarine Severodvinsk, diesel-electric submarine Kaluga, corvettes Snezhnogorsk and Brest, as well as support ships operated in the Barents Sea. Additionally, three LSTs were deploying to the Black Sea (Olenogorsky Gornyak, Georgiy Pobedonosets and Pyotr Morgunov).

In the Pacific Fleet, cruiser Varyag, destroyer Admiral Tributs and tanker Boris Butoma were deployed to the Indian Ocean, participating in the third Russo-Sino-Iranian naval exercise, first Russo-Chinese naval exercise away from Russian/Chinese coast that took place in the western Indian Ocean and will finally strengthen Mediterranean squadron. Additionally, submarine Volkhov fired a Kalibr missile in the Sea of Japan and two Tu-142 performed flight above the Okhotsk Sea.

In the Baltic Fleet, corvettes Soobrazitelny and Stoykiy were deployed to the Northern Sea, while Zeleny Dol, Mytishchi, Odintsovo, Aleksin, Kabardino-Balkariya were active in the Baltic Sea. Additionally, three LSTs were deploying to the Black Sea: Korolyov, Minsk and Kaliningrad and intelligence ship Vasily Tatishchev to the Mediterranean Sea, where it will monitor three-carrier exercise with CVN Harry Truman, Cavour and Charles de Gaulle in February 2022.

In the Black Sea Fleet, an exercise was conducted by frigates Admiral Essen, Ladnyy, corvettes Ingushetiya, Grayvoron, Naberezhnye Chelny, R-60, Yeysk, Suzdalets and other ships, totally around 20 ships.

Annual exercise
Russia organises a central military exercise for September each year.

During Zapad 2021, in Northern Fleet two surface groups were active: Admiral Ushakov and Admiral Kasatonov in the Barents Sea (along with coastal systems Bal and Bastion-P) and Severomorsk in the Arctic (along with LST Georgiy Pobedonosets, tug Pamir and tanker Sergey Osipov), as well as submarines Orel and Verkhoturye (along with minesweepers Yelnya, Soloyevetskiy, Yunga, Yadrin and Kotelnich in two groups). In the Baltic Fleet, frigate Yaroslav Mudry, corvettes Steregushchy and Stoykiy and submarine Dmitrov were active (along with coastal system Bal).

Barents Sea

On 22 February 2021, the Northern Fleet conducted an exercise in which cruiser Marshal Ustinov sailed in Varanger Fjord in the area of the Russia–Norway maritime border, becoming the first Russian warship to do so in the post-Cold War era. Sailing was speculated to be response to the US bombers (B-1B) landing in Norway on the same day for the first time.

Other ships active in the area in January–February 2021 included destroyer Severomorsk, frigate  with the tug Altay, nuclear submarine Severodvinsk (that launched a Kalibr missile), corvettes Aysberg, Snezhnogorsk, Yunga and Brest, and salvage vessel Georgiy Titov with deep-submergence rescue vehicle AS-34.

Atlantic
South of Gibraltar, in September–October 2021 Russian Navy deployed destroyer Vice-Admiral Kulakov (along tanker Akademik Pashin and tug Altai) that visited Praia, Capo Verde and performed anti-piracy exercise in the Gulf of Guinea. It was the first deployment of a Russian warship south of Gibraltar since Admiral Gorshkov's 2019 world circumnavigation.

Western Atlantic and US eastern seaboard
In August 2012, the news media published an unconfirmed report that a Akula-class submarine operated in the Gulf of Mexico purportedly undetected for over a month, sparking controversy within US military and political circles, with US Senator John Cornyn of the Senate Armed Services Committee demanding details of this deployment from Admiral Jonathan W. Greenert, the Chief of Naval Operations. Adm Greenert stated that no Russian submarine had operated in the Gulf of Mexico.

North Atlantic and Mediterranean Sea
In February 2008 a Russian Northern Fleet naval task force completed a two-month deployment in the Mediterranean Sea and the North Atlantic which started on 4 December 2007. The operation was the first large-scale Russian Navy deployment to the Atlantic and the Mediterranean in 15 years. During the operation the navy practiced rescue and counter-terror operations, reconnaissance, and missile and bomb strikes on the (theoretical) enemy's naval task force. Over 40 Russian Air Force aircraft took part in joint exercises with the navy as well.

Russian warships were scheduled to participate in joint naval exercises with the Venezuelan Navy in the Caribbean on 10–14 November, in line with the 2008 training program, and in order to expand military cooperation with foreign navies. These exercises actually took place on 1 December.
 11 October 2008, Russian warships bound for Venezuela, including the nuclear-powered cruiser Pyotr Velikiy, put in at the Libyan port of Tripoli for resupply.
 From Venezuela Petr Velikiy proceeded alone to a port call in Cape Town, South Africa, then participated in the INDRA-2009 exercise off western India, briefly engaged in counter-piracy operations in the Gulf of Aden, and returned to its homeport of Severomorsk in March 2009. The other ships in company returned to their home base in the Northern Fleet.
 A group of Pacific Fleet ships arrived in the Mediterranean Sea on 15 May 2013 having sailed from Vladivostok on 19 March 2013. , the Ropucha-class landing ships Peresvet and Admiral Nevelskoy, the tanker Pechenga and the rescue tug Fotiy Krylov augmented the Russian Navy's grouping there, and carried out tasks in the Black Sea and Mediterranean Sea. The Pacific Fleet ships practiced activities jointly with forces from other Russian navy fleets and made a number of business calls at ports in the region, including a call at Limassol, Cyprus on 17 May 2013.
 The Baltic Fleet Ropucha-class landing ships Kaliningrad, Aleksandr Shabalin and Azov arrived at Novorossiysk naval base on 14 May 2013 having completed their duties in the Mediterranean. The Baltic Fleet ships spent several weeks at Novorossiysk undergoing checks and maintenance and replenishing supplies before resuming their duties in the Mediterranean.
 The Northern Fleet's Udaloy-class destroyer  was reported to be heading for the Atlantic on 20 May 2013 after completing a visit to Norway. The ship had been taking part in the Russian-Norwegian Pomor-2013 exercise and is expected to take on supplies from the tanker Vyazma while at anchor in the North Sea before undertaking a lengthy voyage in the north eastern regions of the Atlantic Ocean.
 On 1 June 2013, Navy Commander Adm Viktor Chirkov said that the aircraft carrier Admiral Kuznetsov is "expected to put out and perform a number of missions in an offshore oceanic zone as part of a group. Northern Fleet naval pilots will perform a number of missions on board this cruiser during the long-range mission." He also stated that the ship's deployment might be as part of a permanent operational group in the Mediterranean. In preparing for the deployment the ships' airwing would not be using the NITKA pilot training facility located in Crimea, Ukraine.
 On 20 October 2016, a Northern Fleet task group headed by Admiral Kuznetsov was monitored by a fleet of least eight ships in the English Channel en route to Syria reportedly to participate in the attack on Aleppo. The British Royal Navy sent multiple ships including HMS Dragon to shadow each warship as the fleet met up with an additional two Russian warships. NATO also tasked its standing naval group SNMG1 to shadow the group and escort it through the Dover Straits towards the Mediterranean.
 On 17 February 2017, the Russian Navy surveillance vessel SSV-175 Viktor Leonov was cruising international waters off the East Coast of the United States. Viktor Leonov is outfitted with a variety of high-tech spying equipment designed to intercept signals intelligence. It first appeared off Delaware and, then moved south of the US submarine base at Groton, Connecticut collecting electronic signals.

Syria

 Sequentially having lost naval support facility access in Albania, Yugoslavia, and Egypt, in 1971 the Soviet Navy began operating from a leased facility in Tartus, Syria. 
 In September 2008, it was reported that Russia and Syria conducted talks about permitting Russia to develop and enlarge its naval base in Syria in order to establish a stronger naval presence in the Mediterranean, and amidst the deteriorating Russia relations with the west in conjunction with the 2008 South Ossetia war and the plans to deploy US missile defence shield in Poland, it has even been asserted that President Assad has agreed to Tartus port's conversion into a permanent Middle East base for Russia's nuclear-armed warships. Moscow and Damascus additionally announced that it would be renovating the port, although there was no mention in the Syrian press.
 On 22 September 2008, Russian Navy spokesman Igor Dygalo said the nuclear-powered Pyotr Velikiy cruiser, accompanied by three other ships, sailed from the Northern Fleet's base of Severomorsk. Dygalo refused to comment on Monday's report in the daily Izvestia claiming that the ships were to make a stopover in the Syrian port of Tartus on their way to Venezuela. Russian officials said the Soviet-era base there was being renovated to serve as a foothold for a permanent Russian navy presence in the Mediterranean.
 In late November 2011, Pravda and Reuters wrote that a naval flotilla led by the aircraft carrier Admiral Kuznetsov would sail to its naval base in Tartus as a show of support for the al-Assad regime. Such a visit is not possible because the lengths of all of Russia's current modern warships exceed the size of the two 100 meter piers located at the Russian leasehold in Tartus. (see next paragraph)
 On 29 November 2011, Army General Nikolay Makarov, Chief of the Russian General Staff, said that sending ships of the Russian Navy to the Mediterranean Sea is linked to exercises and not to the situation in Syria. "In the event of necessity, namely to carry out repairs, to take water and food on board and to allow rest for the crews, Russian ships may visit Tartus but in this case this has not been included in the plan of the trip," the Interfax source said. He also noted that the size of Admiral Kuznetsov does not allow it to moor in Tartus because the port does not have suitable infrastructure, i.e., large enough mooring.

Sudan
 On 23 July 2019, Russia and Sudan signed an agreement on establishment of a Russian naval base in Port Sudan in Khartoum and, on 1 December 2020, in Moscow. On 25 June 2021, Russian prime minister Mishustin submitted the agreement for ratification. On 12 July, Sudan was preparing for ratification too.
 Between 28 February and 2 May 2021, a number of Russian ships called at Port Sudan, beginning with frigate Admiral Grigorovich in what was the first visit of a Russian warship to Sudan in the modern history. This was followed by corvette Stoikiy and tug Kola on 19 March, signals intelligence ship Ivan Khurs on 10 April, signals intelligence ship Vasily Tatishchev and its accompanying repair ship PM-138 on 2 May.

Algeria
Russia and Algeria hold annual naval exercise at the end of the year.
 Between 16 and 17 November 2021, Russo-Algerian naval exercise was conducted. Russian Black Sea Fleet's frigate Admiral Grigorovich, patrol ship Vasily Bykov and seagoing tug SB-742 took part, as well as Algerian frigate Harrad,  training vessel La Sammam and rescue vessel El Munjid.

Egypt
Russia and Egypt have held an annual naval exercise at the end of the year since 2015. Usually, the exercise is conducted in the Eastern Mediterranean Sea, an exception being 2020, when the exercise took place in the Black Sea. From 3–10 December 2021, another Russo-Egyptian naval exercise, Bridge of Friendship, took place in the Eastern Mediterranean Sea. The Russian task force comprised frigate Admiral Grigorovich, patrol ship Dmitry Rogachev and sea-going tug SB-742.

Caribbean Sea
On 8 September 2008, it was announced that the Pyotr Velikiy would sail to the Caribbean Sea in order to participate in naval exercises with the Venezuelan Navy. This represented the first major Russian show of force in that sea since the end of the Cold War. On 22 September the Kirov-class nuclear missile cruiser Pyotr Velikiy and the Udaloy class large anti-submarine ship Admiral Chabanenko, accompanied by support vessels, left their home port of Severomorsk for naval exercises with Venezuela scheduled for early November 2008.  On 25 November 2008, a group of warships from Russia's Northern Fleet arrived at the Venezuelan port of La Guaira.

 East Africa: Somali Coast 
 On 24 September 2008, the Russian frigate Neustrashimy left its home base at Baltiysk, Kaliningrad Oblast, Russia, for counter-piracy operations near the Somali coast.
 From 11 January to 17 March 2009, the Admiral Vinogradov took up the counter-piracy mission from the Neustrashimy and upon completion took a course home to Vladivostok by way of a port visit to Jakarta, Indonesia 24–28 March 2009.Морская коллегия. – Новости. Отряд кораблей Тихоокеанского флота в составе большого противолодочного корабля «Адмирал Виноградов» и танкера «Борис Бутома» закончил патрулирование в районе Африканского рога . Morskayakollegiya.ru (30 August 2010). Retrieved on 9 September 2010.
 From 26 April to 7 June 2009, the Pacific Fleet destroyer Admiral Panteleyev took up counter-piracy duties in the Gulf of Aden, having left Vladivostok at the end of March 2009 to relieve the Admiral Vinogradov. It returned to Vladivostok on 1 July."Адмирал Пантелеев" вернулся во Владивосток после успешно выполненной миссии -Русское зарубежье, российские соотечественники, русские за границей, русские за рубежом, соотечественники, русскоязычное население, русские общины, диаспора, эмиграция . Russkie.org. Retrieved on 9 September 2010.

Indian Ocean and Arabian Sea
Main article: Cam Ranh Air Base
 On 11 January 2009, Army General Nikolai Makarov, Chief of the Russian General Staff, announced that the Kirov-class nuclear-powered cruiser Pyotr Velikiy and five other ships would take part in exercises with the Indian Navy in late January 2009.
 In 2021, Black Sea Fleet's intelligence ship Kildin entered port Oman on 1 November. Besides, in summer, the newly built frigate Gremyashchy and Kilo (Varshavanka) class diesel-electric submarines Petropavlovsk-Kamchatsky and Volkhov transited Indian Ocean on their way from the Baltic Sea to the Pacific Ocean.

East Asia
Since 2012, Russia and China have conducted an annual naval exercise. In even years, they take place off Chinese coast (usually in the Yellow Sea), and in odd years off Russian coast (usually in the Sea of Japan). In 2015 and 2017, in addition to the exercises in the Sea of Japan, additional exercises in the Mediterranean and Baltic Sea, respectively, were held. In 2021, for the first time the exercise surpassed the defensive character as Russian and Chinese warships passed through the Tsugaru Strait between Japanese islands Hokkaido and Honshu.

 On 23 October 2021, Russian and Chinese Navies conducted first ever joint patrol. Five warships of each navy participated, including two destroyers, two corvettes and a command ship. Russian Navy was represented by destroyers Admiral Panteleyev and Admiral Tributs, corvettes Gromky and Geroy Rossiyskoy federatsii Aldar Tsydenzhapov and tracking ship Marshal Krylov. The patrol group passed through the Tsugaru Strait. Joint Russo-Chinese operations imply readiness of both superpowers to cooperate to limit the power of the American-led order in the Asia-Pacific region.
 From 1–3 December 2021, the first naval exercise between Russia and ASEAN occurred in the Indonesian territorial waters. Russia was represented by destroyer Admiral Panteleyev, Vietnam by frigate Ly Thai To, Indonesia by frigate Raden Eddy Martadinata, Malaysia by frigate Lekiu, Singapore by corvette Vigour, Brunei by off-shore patrol vessel Daruttaqwa, Thailand by frigate Kraburi and Myanmar by frigate Kyansittha, while Philippines joined as an observer.

See also
History of the Russian Navy
 Future of the Russian Navy
 Russian Naval Academy
 List of ships of the line of Russia
 List of aircraft carriers of Russia and the Soviet Union
 List of Russian Navy cruisers
 List of Russian Navy equipment
 List of ships of Russia by project number
 List of Soviet and Russian submarine classes
 List of active Russian Navy ships for current Order of Battle of the Russian Navy
 Russian Hydrographic Service
 Russian Torpedoes

 Notes 

 References 

 Further reading 
 Lebedev A.A. To March and Battle Ready? The Combat Capabilities of Naval Squadrons Russian Sailing Fleet XVIII – mid XIX centuries. from the Point of View of the Status of Their Personnel. SPb, 2015. .
 Reuben Johnson, "Russian Navy 'faces irreversible collapse,'" Jane's Defence Weekly'', 15 July 2009, and link to original Russian article at ВМФ умрет в ближайшие годы. Nvo.ng.ru (2009-07-03). Retrieved on 2010-09-09.
 "Russia Will Not Build Aircraft Carriers Till 2010." RIA Novosti. 16 May 2005. (Via Lexis-Nexis, 27 July 2005).
 "The Russian Navy – A Historic Transition." U.S. Office of Naval Intelligence. December 2015

External links 

 

 
Military of Russia
Military units and formations established in 1992
1992 establishments in Russia